Parotis baldersalis is a moth in the family Crambidae. It was described by Francis Walker in 1859. It is found in Cameroon, the Democratic Republic of the Congo (North Kivu), Sierra Leone and South Africa (KwaZulu-Natal, Gauteng).

References

Moths described in 1859
Spilomelinae